Frauen und Film (Women and Film) is a German feminist film journal.

History 
Frauen und Film was founded in Berlin in 1974 by filmmaker Helke Sander. Since 1983 it has been based in Frankfurt.

External links 

Frauen und Film website: http://www.frauenundfilm.de/

References 

Film studies journals
Cultural magazines published in Germany
Feminist magazines